Emmanuel Christian School, Leicester is a small, independent, co-educational Christian school for pupils aged 4–16. Opening in August 2003, it was the first (and remains the only according to Ofsted and government records) independent Christian school in Leicestershire. The school is registered in Didsbury Street, Braunstone in Leicester.

Private schools in Leicester
Educational institutions established in 2003
2003 establishments in England